Jurģis Pučinsks (born 3 January 1973 in Daugavpils) is a former Latvian soccer player who played  as a midfielder and is now a manager. 

He signed with Luch-Energia Vladivostok for the Russian First Division 2004 season, but did not feature in any league matches. For Latvia national football team he got 14 caps and was in squad for Euro 2004, without playing any game.

References

1973 births
Living people
Latvian footballers
Latvia international footballers
Association football midfielders
UEFA Euro 2004 players
Dinaburg FC players
FK Liepājas Metalurgs players
Skonto FC players
FC Luch Vladivostok players
Latvian expatriate footballers
Expatriate footballers in Russia
Latvian expatriate sportspeople in Russia
Sportspeople from Daugavpils
FK Ventspils managers
Latvian football managers